The Under-19 World Lacrosse Championships (U-19) are held separately for men and women every four years to award world championships for the under-19 age group in men's lacrosse and women's lacrosse. The tournaments are sanctioned by World Lacrosse.

These championships were first held for men in 1988 and for women in 1995. They have only been held in the same year twice and both times in the same country; 1999 in Australia and 2003 in the United States. The United States has won every men's U-19 tournament and all but two women's U-19 tourneys.

The 2008 men's championship was held in July 2008 in Coquitlam, British Columbia, Canada and was won by the United States. The 2012 men's tournament was held in Turku, Finland, with the United States winning the title, defeating Canada 10–8, despite a pair of pool-play losses to Canada and the Iroquois Nationals. The Iroquois Nationals finished third after an 18–1 win over England. The 2016 championship for men was held July 7–16, 2016, again in Coquitlam, British Columbia, just outside Vancouver. The U.S. won its eighth title, coming back from being down 6–0 to eventually defeat Canada 13–12.

The most recent championship for women was held in Edinburgh, Scotland in 2015. The Haudenosaunee Nationals women's lacrosse team could not participate due to British passport requirements. Canada won its first gold medal, defeating the United States 9–8 in the final.

At the 2022 event in Limerick, Ireland, a record number of 23 teams will participate.

Men's U-19 World Championship

Source:

Women's U-19 World Championship

Source:

See also
World Lacrosse Championship
Women's Lacrosse World Cup

References

External links
2016 Under-19 Men's World Lacrosse Championship 
2015 Under-19 Women's World Lacrosse Championship
2008 U-19 Men's World Lacrosse Championship
2007 Under-19 Women's World Lacrosse Championship
 2022 World Lacrosse Men's U21 World Championship

 
Recurring sporting events established in 1988
Recurring sporting events established in 1995